The Hewlett-Packard series 80 of small scientific desktop computers was introduced in 1980, beginning with the popular HP-85 targeted at engineering and control applications. They provided the capability of the HP 9800 series desktop computers with an integrated monitor in a smaller package including storage and printer, at half the price.

Features

The first model of the Series 80 was the HP-85, introduced in January 1980. BYTE wrote "we were impressed with the performance ... the graphics alone make this an attractive, albeit not inexpensive, alternate to existing small systems on the market ... it is our guess that many personal computer experimenters and hackers will want this machine."

In a typewriter-style desktop case, the  HP-85 contains the CPU and keyboard, with a ROM-based operating system (like the 9800 series), 16 KB dynamic RAM, a 5-inch CRT screen (16 lines of 32 characters, or 256×192 pixels), a tape drive for DC-100 cartridges ( capacity,  transfer), and a thermal printer.  Both the screen and printer display graphics in addition to text, and the printer can copy anything shown on the screen. The chassis includes four module slots in the back for expansion which can hold memory modules, ROM extensions, or interfaces such as RS-232 and GPIB. 
All components were designed at the Hewlett-Packard Personal Computer Division in Corvallis, Oregon, including the processor and core chipset.

Later models offered variations such as different or external displays, built-in interfaces or a rack-mountable enclosure (see table below for details).

Programs could be stored on DC-100 cartridge tapes or on external disk/tape units.

Despite the comparatively low processor clock frequency, the machines were quite advanced compared to other desktop computers of the time, in particular regarding software features relevant to technical and scientific use.  The standard number representation was a floating point format with a 12-digit (decimal) mantissa and exponents up to ±499.  The interpreter supported a full set of scientific functions (trigonometric functions, logarithm etc.) at this accuracy.  The language supported two-dimensional arrays, and a ROM extension made high-level functions such as matrix multiplication and inversion available.

For the larger HP-86 and HP-87 series, HP also offered a plug-in CP/M processor card with a separate Zilog Z80 processor.

Historical context
The late 1970s saw the development of inexpensive home computers such as the Apple and TRS-80. Steve Wozniak had developed the Apple computer with the idea of a computer that worked in BASIC when it was turned on, and offered HP rights to the Apple computer. He was turned down and was given a legal release. In an interview he did note that soon after that, the calculator division was starting an 8-bit computer project called Capricorn, and he wasn't allowed to work on that project. Ultimately, the market for desktop computing would go to IBM PC compatible personal computers with a floppy disk drive based operating system, and an industry standard Intel 8088 processor  (the IBM PC was announced shortly after the 80 series).

Hardware

Models

ROM extensions

Note: The HP-86/87 series used different ROMs (yellow labelling) from the 85/83 models (white labelling).

Hardware extensions

Interfaces

The interface modules for the series 80 were built around a proprietary bus interface chip connecting a standard Intel 8049 microcontroller to the main bus.  Interface functions such as handshaking were offloaded to the 8049 firmware.

Notes

External links

series80.org
http://www.hpmuseum.org/hp85.htm

HP Series 80 discussion and support group
https://vintagecomputers.sdfeu.org/hp85/

Repairing the HP-85 tape drive
Series 80 Listings and files hosted at AKSO
HP Series 80 Configuration Guide hosted at www.computercollector.com
Page WEB française Page perso d'un utilisateur du HP86, périphériques, programmation, transfert de fichiers, photos. (français)
English WEB page HP86 user Web page with photos, peripherals, programmation, file transfer. (English)
HP85 Vintage Computer Teardown
MS Windows Series 80 emulator and ROM/binary-program Disassembler.

series 80